A civil defense siren, also known as an air-raid siren or tornado siren, is a siren used to provide an emergency population warning to the general population of approaching danger. It is sometimes sounded again to indicate the danger has passed. Some sirens, especially within small municipalities, are also used to alert the fire department when needed. Initially designed to warn city dwellers of air raids during World War II, they were later used to warn of nuclear attack and natural disasters, such as tornadoes. The generalized nature of sirens led to many of them being replaced with more specific warnings, such as the broadcast-based Emergency Alert System and the Cell Broadcast-based Wireless Emergency Alerts and EU-Alert mobile technologies.

A mechanical siren generates sound by spinning a slotted chopper wheel to interrupt a stream of air at a regular rate.

By use of varying tones or binary patterns of sound, different alert conditions can be called. Electronic sirens can transmit voice announcements in addition to alert tone signals. Siren systems may be electronically controlled and integrated into other warning systems.

Sirens in integrated public warning systems

Sirens are sometimes integrated into a warning system that links sirens with other warning media, such as the radio and TV Emergency Alert System, NOAA Weather Radio, telephone alerting systems, Reverse 911, Cable Override, and wireless alerting systems in the United States and the National Public Alerting System, Alert Ready, in Canada. This fluid approach enhances the credibility of warnings and reduces the risk of assumed false alarms by corroborating warning messages through multiple forms of media. The Common Alerting Protocol is a technical standard for this sort of multi-system integration.

Siren installations have many ways of being activated. Commonly used methods are dual-tone multi-frequency signaling (DTMF) or public switched telephone network (PSTN) using telephone lines, but activation can also be done via radio broadcast. This method opens up vulnerability for exploitation, but there are protections from false alarms. These sirens can also be tied into other networks such as a fire department's volunteer notification/paging system. The basics of this type of installation would consist of a device (possibly the same pager the firefighters have) connected to the controller/timer system of the siren. When a page is received, the siren is activated.

Types of sirens

Mechanical sirens

Basic design 

A mechanical siren uses a rotor and stator to chop an air stream, which is forced through the siren by radial vanes in the spinning rotor. An example of this type of siren is the Federal Signal 2T22, which was originally developed during the Cold War and produced from the early 1950s to the late 1980s. This particular design employs dual rotors and stators to sound each pitch. Because the sound power output of this type of siren is the same in every direction at all times, it is described as omnidirectional. The Federal 2T22 was also marketed in a 3-signal configuration known as the Federal Signal 3T22, with the capability for a "hi-lo" (High-Low) signal.

While some mechanical sirens produce sound in all directions simultaneously, other designs produce sound in only one direction, while employing a rotator mechanism to turn the siren head through 360 degrees of rotation. One rare type of mechanical siren, the Federal Signal RSH-10 ("Thunderbeam"), does not rotate or produce equal sound output in all directions. It instead uses a slowly rotating angled disc below the siren which directs the siren's output throughout 360 degrees.

Supercharged 
A variation of the electromechanical siren is a "supercharged" siren. A supercharged siren uses a separate source, usually a supercharger, which forces air into the rotor assembly of the siren. This increases the air pressure in the rotor assembly, causing the sound output of the siren to increase heavily, which in return increases the sound range by a large amount. The superchargers are generally driven by an electric motor, but in rare cases, can be driven by an engine. Federal Signal took advantage of this design and created their Thunderbolt Siren Series. Within the Thunderbolt product line, three different configurations were offered: the Thunderbolt 1000, a single-tone siren; the Thunderbolt 1000T, a dual-tone siren; and the Thunderbolt 1003, a variation of the 1000T that employs solenoid-actuated slide valves to create a "hi-lo" (High-Low) signal primarily used as a fire signal.

A very early model called the Thunderbolt 2000 was offered in both single tone and dual tone. The only notable difference between the Thunderbolt 2000 and later editions is that its blower is driven by an Onan two cylinder gasoline engine. Another example of a siren that has a separate blower is the Alerting Communicators of America (ACA) Hurricane. One more example of a siren with a blower is the SoCal Edison Model 120, built specifically for the San Onofre Nuclear Generating Station. The SoCal Edison Model 120 is no longer standing out in public, as only one exists, and is owned privately.

Pneumatic 
Another variation on the electromechanical siren is the pneumatic  (HLS), first produced by the German firm Pintsch-Bamag and later by the German firm Hörmann. Soon afterward, Hörmann improved on the design to create the HLS 273, which did away with the massive siren head of the original in favor of a more compact head and cast aluminum exponential-profile horns. These sirens stored a reservoir of compressed air, recharged periodically by a diesel engine-driven compressor in a vault in the base of the massive siren unit. The later HLS 273 placed the large (6,000 liter) air tank underground beside the machinery vault, instead of in the mast itself as in the earlier HLS units.

Electronic sirens

Electronic sirens consist of an electronic tone generator, a high-power amplifier, and a horn loudspeaker. Typically, the loudspeaker unit incorporates horn loading, causing them to be similar in appearance to some electromechanical sirens. Many of these loudspeakers incorporate a vertical array of horns to achieve pattern control in the vertical plane. Each cell of the loudspeaker horn is driven by one or more compression drivers. One type of compression driver for this type of loudspeaker handles 400 watts of electrical power and uses two doughnut-shaped permanent magnet slugs to provide magnetic flux. For siren applications, high-fidelity sound is a secondary concern to high output, and siren drivers typically produce large amounts of distortion which would not be tolerable in an audio system where fidelity is important. Most newer (and some older) electronic sirens have the ability to store digital audio files. These audio files could be custom sounds, or emergency messages. Depending on the situation, the stored sound file can broadcast through the siren. These sirens could also come with a Microphone Jack to broadcast live messages via microphone.

As with electromechanical sirens, there are both omnidirectional, directional, and rotating categories, though Whelen Engineering produces sirens which oscillate through 360 degrees, rotating in one direction and then in the other to allow a hard-wired connection between the amplifiers and the siren drivers. These sirens can also be set to rotate any amount from 0 to 360 degrees, allowing sirens to broadcast only in certain directions.

Electronic sirens may be mechanically rotated to cover a wide area, or may have transducers facing in all directions to make an omnidirectional pattern. A directional siren may be applied where notification is only required for a defined area in one direction.

Civil defense sirens around the world

Middle East

Iran, Kuwait, and Iraq
Kuwait has a entire siren system of Federal Signal Modulators. They once had an entire system of Thunderbolt system 7000's, until they all got replaced.

Israel

Israel has more than 3,100 warning sirens. Most of the sirens in urban areas are German-made HLS sirens, models F71 and ECN3000. All the other sirens are HPSS32 models made by Acoustic Technologies (ATI). During the early 2010s, mechanical sirens were gradually phased out and replaced by electronic ones, although the mechanical ones were generally left standing. The air-raid sirens are called  (az'aka 'alarm'), and consist of a continuous ascending and descending tone. The "all clear" signal, called  (tzfirat harga'a), is a constant single-pitch sound. In recent conflicts, use of the "all clear" signal has been discontinued, as it was seen as causing unnecessary confusion and alarm. In certain regions in the south of Israel, which regularly undergo rocket attacks from Gaza, a specialized system called Red Color is used.

There is an earthquake warning system in Israel, which uses the sirens, which called "תרועה" (Trua).

The "all clear" signal is used three times per year to denote a moment of silence (of one or two minutes): once on Israel's Holocaust Remembrance Day and twice on the Day of Remembrance.

Saudi Arabia
Most minaret speakers are used as sirens. The purpose of warnings is to notify the population of a danger that threatens their lives. Individuals must go to shelters or their homes, lock doors and windows, take appropriate protective actions, and listen through the radio and television for instructions of civil defense. The entire siren system is ASC I-Force and Whelen WPS-2900 series. As well as some Federal Signal Modulators in Air Force Bases, and a FS EOWS 1212 in Dammam.     

Turkey

Turkey used to have mechanical sirens in Istanbul until before around the early 2000s, when most of them were decommissioned and minaret speakers were most commonly used instead. Even though the main models of the warning speakers are unknown, there is a slightly common presence of Federal Signal and Hörmann, despite very rare cases of some Elektror or Siemens models remaining. They test during the memorial of Atatürk's death and often sound off for common emergencies such as tornadoes, chemical plant issues or incoming enemy attack.

Asia

The People's Republic of China
China has sirens located in most cities and towns, particularly those located in or near disputed territories. If the state declares a state of emergency due to attacks or invasion, or when there is a very high risk of military conflict, sirens will warn the public of possible attacks or invasion. The sirens are controlled by the People's Liberation Army.

There are annual or semi-annual test runs, often occurring on commemorative dates that are associated with the Second Sino-Japanese War. For example, Nanjing annually tests air raid sirens at 10 a.m. on 13 December, followed by a moment of silence to commemorate the Nanking Massacre. There have also been some commemorative tests during the memorial periods of major disasters, such as on 19 May 2008 in memory of victims of the 2008 Sichuan Earthquake.

The air raid warning comes in 3 types:
Pre-raid warning: a 36-second high-tone followed by a 24-second low-tone, with three cycles per period. This warning signifies an air raid is likely about to take place.
Raid warning: a 6-second high-tone followed by a 6-second low tone, with 15 cycles per period. This signifies that an air raid is imminent.
Post-raid warning: a single 3-minute high-tone. When sounded, it signifies an end to the raid or a cool-down of the wartime situation.

Taiwan

Taiwanese civil defense sirens are erected on police stations and commanded by the nation's Civil Defense Office. The government issues air raid warnings, as well as tsunami warnings, through the sirens in conjunction with their own Public Warning System that utilizes 4G LTE cell signals. The Taiwanese government also holds annual air-raid drills called Wan-an drills so the populace can be familiar with what to do in an air raid, given the high risk of war with neighboring Mainland China.

India
Mumbai has around 200–250 functional sirens. The government is planning to change the system by incorporating modern wireless and digital technology in place of the present landline switching system.

In Mumbai civil defence, sirens were used during the Indo-Pakistan wars of 1965 and 1971, warning civilians about air raids by the Pakistan Air Force. At night, sirens were also used to indicate blackouts, when all lights in Mumbai were switched off. Daily tests of the sirens at 9 a.m. were recently reduced to once per month. They are controlled by the Regional Civil Defence Control Center, Mumbai, with input from Indian Defence Services. Sirens are also used to denote a minute's worth of silence on special occasions.

Japan
Japan has bosai musen and other systems like Toshiba and NEC.

Singapore

Singapore currently has a network of 284 stationary sirens named the Public Warning System which warns the entire country of air raids, as well as human-made and natural disasters (except earth tremors). Singapore's sirens are tested at noon on the first day of every month. During the test, the sirens sound a light cheerful chime instead of any of the three signals. The sirens look very similar to the ECN3000 Israel version.

South Korea
Nearly all towns and cities are equipped with civil defense sirens in case of natural disasters or missile attacks from North Korea. South Korea holds civil defense drills every month to prepare for such scenarios.

Europe

Austria
Austria is fully covered with an operational air-raid siren system consisting of 8,203 devices as of 2012. They are tested weekly at noon on Saturdays (except in Vienna) with the  signal, a 15-second continuous tone. Every year on the first Saturday of October, the whole range of alarm signals (with the exception of the fire alert) is sounded as a system test and to familiarize the population with the signals.
 Warning: a 3-minute continuous tone. People are warned of an incoming danger and advised to tune into the appropriate Ö2 regional radio station or ORF 2 for further instructions.
 General alarm: a 1-minute ascending and descending tone. Danger is imminent; people should seek shelter immediately and listen to radio or TV.
 End of danger: a 1-minute continuous tone. The danger is over, and shelters can be left. Any hazards potentially encountered during normal life are announced in the media.
 Fire alert: three 15-second continuous tones separated by 7-second intervals. All firemen of volunteer fire brigades should report to their fire station immediately. This signal is being used less and less, as many fire brigades have begun to alert their members by radio.

Belgium
Belgium used to test its air raid sirens every first Thursday of the trimester (three-month period). Sirens are Sonnenburg Electronic sirens. There are 540 sirens all across the country. A non-audible test was performed every day, and the last test occurred on 4 October 2018. Afterwards, the network was decommissioned. The sirens remain around nuclear facilities, but no tests are performed. The official recommendation is that people subscribe to BE-Alert, a system where information is provided via SMS, e-mail or phone.

Bulgaria
Bulgaria has over 4000 sirens deployed around in the country, especially Sofia. These are likely used to warn the peaceful Bulgarian population of earthquakes. Sirens were first installed during the WW2 times to warn the public of incoming attacks by the Nazi Germany; these were replaced by electronic ones during the 1990s. Sirens are tested on the first Wednesday of June every year to see if they're functioning properly. The public is informed about the test earlier on TV, radio or press so that it doesn't cause mass panic among the peaceful Bulgarians citizens. Sirens are being mainly electronic ones (German made type ECN units or other high powered speaker systems on top of public buildings). The signals may include - attack (a 1-minute wailing tone used to indicate an incoming danger) and alert (sometimes referred to as the "all clear" signal which is a continuous single tone). Strongest tremors in Bulgaria are quite rare, so a special earthquake warning system is not needed.

Czech Republic
The Czech Republic has around 6,000 sirens. Within these 6,000 sirens which include mechanical sirens and electronic sirens, are tested every first Wednesday of the month. There are three warning signals, which are accompanied by a verbal message in Czech and usually with an English and German translation on electronic sirens. There is also an emergency broadcast on TV channels, maintained by Česká televize, and radio channels, maintained by Český rozhlas.

 General alert: a 140 second long fluctuating tone. The alert can be repeated up to 3 times in 3-minute intervals, and has 4 possible verbal messages:
 The danger is unspecified and people should go inside a building, close the doors and windows (the alert usually means a dangerous element may be present in the air), and turn the TV or radio to an appropriate channel to find out more;
 A flooding alert. (Siren signals for Flooding alert is not used anymore). The required action is that people should turn on the radio and get away from the source of danger (usually a river);
 There was a chemical accident. People should behave the same way as during an  message;
 There was a radioactive accident. People should behave the same way as during an  message.
 Fire alert: a 60 second long still tone with a pause. It is used to alert firefighters of a fire, accompanied by this verbal message: 
 All clear: There is no all clear signal, only a verbal message:

Denmark
There are 1,078 electronic warning sirens have been installed in Denmark by HSS Engineering. The sirens are placed on the tops of buildings or on masts. This warning system makes it possible to warn the populations of all urban areas with more than 1,000 inhabitants. This means that about 80% of Denmark's population can be warned using stationary sirens. The remaining 20% are warned by mobile sirens mounted on police cars. The function of the sirens is tested every night, but does not produce any sound. Once every year, on the first Wednesday of May at 12:00, the sirens are tested with sound.

Finland
A general alarm consists of a repeating 1-minute sound, made up of tones that ascend for 7 seconds and descend for 7 seconds. The end of danger is signaled by a 1-minute continuous tone. Warning sirens are tested on the first Monday of every month at noon. The testing alarm is shorter than the general alarm (only lasting for 7 or 14 seconds) and may be a flat tone. The sirens are tested on the first Monday of every month at 12:00.

France
In France, the emergency population warning network is called the "Réseau national d'alerte" (RNA). The system is inherited from the air raid siren network developed before World WarII. It consists of about 4,500 electronic or electromechanical sirens placed all over France. The system is tested each month at noon on the first Wednesday. The most common siren type is the electromechanical KM Europ 8 port single tone siren. These sirens have a very characteristic sound: a very fast wind-up and a lower pitch than most sirens (the pitch is comparable to a STL-10 on a lower frequency resulting on a lower pitch). A recording of these sirens was used in the movie Silent Hill.

Germany
As the civil defense sirens were also frequently used to alert volunteer firefighters, many sirens were sold to municipalities for a symbolic price; others were dismantled. In the 2000s, it was realized that the ability to warn the public is not only necessary in cases of war, but also in events like natural disasters, chemical or nuclear accidents, or terrorist attacks. As a result, some cities like Düsseldorf and Dresden began to rebuild their warning sirens. In Hamburg, the sirens are still operational. They also warn the public during storm surges; for instance, all towns in the Moselle Valley continue to operate and test their warning sirens. The majority of operational sirens in Germany are either electric-mechanical type E57 or electronic sirens.

There are no precise official numbers as to how many sirens there used to be, as most of the documents regarding the system's construction and upkeep have been disposed of after the Cold War ended. However, estimates place the number of operational sirens during the system's peak at around 80,000 in West Germany alone. Accounts as to how many of those sirens are still in operation vary significantly depending on the source. The most prominent German company regarding manufacturing and maintenance of sirens, Hörmann Industries, states on its website that they are in charge of maintaining over 60,000 sirens. Granted, that includes mobile sirens that can be mounted on vehicles, but one can deduct from this information that there could be at least around 50,000 stationary sirens still in operation today, many of the once electro-mechanical sirens having been replaced with newer electronic models.

During World WarII, Berlin's air raid sirens became known by the city's residents as "Meier's trumpets" or "Meier's hunting horns" due to Luftwaffe chief Hermann Goering's boast that "If a single bomb ever falls on Berlin, you can call me Meier!".

Hungary
Hungary has sirens since World War 2 to warn of the air raids, this system of sirens were consisted of "Fm Si 41" sirens, which are Hungarian made, but under the license of the German "Siemens-Schuckert". There were 2 more type of sirens: Elbtalwerk L335/L345 and Elektror L1. Later in the Cold War-era, there was a lot of sirens got placed in areas, which didn't have sirens before, later in the 70s, they slowly started replacing the WW2-era siren system. However this was a downgrade, the Cold War-era sirens had control panels, which didn't able to remotely control the sirens, so if a town had 34 sirens, the Civil Defense had to go to all of the sirens and turn them on locally. The original "Siren Program" is abandoned by now, however in 2011, they did a "Nationwide Civil Defense Drill", this was consisted of the testing of all the 2500 sirens, placed all over the county. After this, they started to removing the sirens, by every year, the number of sirens are going down. There are only a few counties left, which still operate the old sirens:

-Heves County: Testing, Maintaning all of the county's sirens.
-Győr-Moson-Sopron County: Testing, Maintaning the big town's sirens, they randomly do this on villages too.
-Komárom-Esztergom County: They tested, maintaned all of the county's sirens up until 2014, when a few cities got a new siren system (MoLaRi).
-Budapest: In Budapest, there are 2 districts, which still operate the sirens: Soroksár, Csepel.

MoLaRi and LTTR:
The LTTR (Citizen Informing and Alarming) is a siren system, which got installed in a 30 km distance of the Paks Nuclear Powerplant to warn citizen's about a possibly emergency.
Paks NPP Siren Signals: 
-6 second going up and down signal for 1x time(Growl Test)
-2 minute changing siren signal (Emergency Occurred)
-Continuous siren signal for 30 seconds, with 30 seconds pause for 2x (End of Emergency)
-Chaning siren signal 3x times for 30 seconds, with 30 seconds pauses. (Air Raid Attack)
-Silent Test

Source: https://docplayer.hu/12118795-Lakossagi-tajekoztato-es-riasztorendszer-ltrr.html

MoLaRi (Monitored Civil Protection Alarm)
The MoLaRi systems are built near the zones, which has facilities/factories working with hazard materials.
They are tested at 11AM first Monday of the month.
They are installed in:
• Békés county: Orosháza
• Borsod-Abaúj-Zemplén county: Kazincbarcika, Berente, Sajószentpéter, Sajóbábony, Tiszaújváros, Oszlár, Tiszapalkonya
• Budapest: IV, IX, X, XIII, XIV, XV, XVI, XIX, XX Districts
• Csongrád-Csanád county: Algyő
• Fejér county: Ercsi, Ráckeresztúr, Dunaújváros, Szabadegyháza
• Hajdú-Bihar County: Hajdúszoboszló
• Heves county: Hort
• Komárom-Esztergom county: Nyergesújfalu, Dorog, Esztergom-Kertváros, Almásfüzitő, Komárom (Szőny)
• Pest county: Százhalombatta, Szigetcsép, Göd
• Tolna County: Cellar
• Vas county: Répcelak
• Veszprém county: Várpalota, Gógánfa, Ukk, Berhida, Pétfürdő
• Zala county: Újudvar, Gelsesziget, Zalaegerszeg

Siren Signals (Applies to MoLaRi, Electro-mechanical sirens): -6 second going up and down signal for 1x time(Growl Test)
-2 minute changing siren signal (Emergency Occurred)
-Continuous siren signal for 30 seconds, with 30 seconds pause for 2x (End of Emergency)
-Changing siren signal 3x times for 30 seconds, with 30 seconds pauses. (Air Raid Attack)

Source: https://www.katasztrofavedelem.hu/49/molari-rendszer

Note: They always announce every siren's test on local media, on the newer sirens, they also do voice announcements: Attention it's a test, attention it's a test! Figyelem ez próba, Figyelem ez próba!

Italy
The Italian War Ministry began installing air raid sirens and issuing air defence regulations in 1938. Production was entrusted to La Sonora, founded in 1911 and still active today.

During World WarII, every town had a siren, and several were present in each large city. Even after the danger of bombings had ended, they were kept to provide warning in case of any threat (e.g. high water in Venice).

As of 2015, some of them still survive. For instance, as many as 34 have been located in Rome using crowdsourcing. Up until the 1980s, they underwent routine maintenance and sounded at noon.

Additionally, the Protezione Civile (Civil Protection) operates sirens to warn the public in case of a threat to the citizen population. Protezione Civile also provides transport needs and military defence for the Government of Italy. These defence systems were put in place in the 1990s and are occasionally still used today.

Netherlands

The Netherlands tests its air-raid sirens once per month, on the first Monday at noon, to keep the public aware of the system. There are about 4,200 sirens placed all across the country.
In March 2015 it was announced that, due to high maintenance costs, the sirens will be taken out of service by the end of 2020. The government has implemented a Cell Broadcast system called NL-Alert, compliant to the mandatory European regulation EU-Alert, to replace the sirens by 2021. However, as of early 2022, the sirens will continue to be heard until another decision has been made.

Norway
Norway has about 1,250 operational sirens (mostly Kockums air horn units rather than motorized sirens), primarily located in cities. Three different signals are used:

 Critical message, listen to radio: three periods of three signals, separated by one minute between the periods. The "critical message" signal is followed by a radio broadcast. It is used in peacetime to warn the population about major accidents, large fires and gas leaks.
 Air raid, take cover: an intermittent signal lasting for about a minute. 
 All clear: a continuous signal sounded for about 30 seconds. 
The sirens are tested twice each year, at noon on the second Wednesday of January and June. As of 2014, only the '"critical message" signal is used during tests. Previously, the signal tested in June would use the "air raid" and "all clear" signals. The latter two are no longer used in peacetime.

There are also sirens in the Storfjord area in Møre og Romsdal county to warn about an avalanche from the mountain Åkerneset. These sirens are not operated by Norwegian Civil Defense department; instead, they are operated by Åksnes/Tafjord Beredskap. These sirens can be found in the villages of 
Stranda, Tafjord, Geiranger, Hellesylt, Linge and Valldal.

Lithuania

Lithuania operates sirens from the Cold War mainly in suburban areas of big cities such as Vilnius, Klaipeda, Kaunas, etc. The most common models are Elektror, Siemens and Hörmann, even though Federal Signal is not too rare in these areas. These sirens can be found in fire stations, factories, police stations and city halls. The attack and all clear signal is used for tests even though tests aren't as frequent as in other areas across Eastern Europe. They soundnoff in case of fires, chemical issues, floods, incoming enemy attack, etc. Testing date for most areas is most likely yearly.

Portugal

Portugal has hundreds of sirens placed across the country. Urban areas most likely use a few electronic sirens even though the presence of warning sirens is more common in suburban or rural areas, where fire stations use them for fire calls. These kinds of sirens are dual-tone and mechanical and are the most common kind of warning siren in Portugal. Between the 2000s and the early 2010s, a few fire sirens were decommissioned due to maintenance upkeep even though most of them remain active.

Romania
In Romania, civil defense sirens have been used since the early 1930s. Originally, each street had a small siren on top of a high-rise building, which could be powered mechanically. During World WarII, the sirens had a single continuous tone to warn of an air strike.

Throughout the Cold War, larger sirens were manufactured locally and installed on various public buildings and residences. The sirens were able to transmit a comprehensive variety of tones, each with a different meaning such as a chemical disaster, an earthquake, a flood, or an imminent air or nuclear strike; each of these tones required the population to either move to higher ground or an ABC shelter. An "all clear" signal was played after the area had been deemed safe for the general public.

Since the 1990s, civil defense sirens have been replaced by electronic sirens and the procedure has been simplified. As of 2013, there are four playable tones: a natural disaster warning, an upcoming air/nuclear strike, an imminent air/nuclear strike, and an "all clear" signal. Taking shelter is no longer a legal requirement, although ABC shelters are still operational.

In August 2017, Romanian authorities started to perform monthly defence siren tests. The first such test took place on 2 August 2017 and is scheduled to be repeated on the first Wednesday of each month, between 10:00 and 11:00am local time. Such tests have been stopped in the wake of the COVID-19 pandemic.

Russia
During the siege of Leningrad, the radio network carried information for the population about raids and air alerts. The famous "metronome" went down in the history of the siege of Leningrad as a cultural monument of resistance of the population.

At that time, there were more than 1 thousand loudspeakers and 400 thousand radio streams operating in the city. If there were no broadcast programs, then the metronome was broadcast with a slow rhythm of 50-55 beats per minute. The network was switched on around the clock, which allowed the population and services to be confident in the operation of the network. By order of the MPVO headquarters, the duty officer of the Central station of the radio network interrupted the broadcast of the program, turned on an electric player with a record of the alarm text. This record was supplemented by 400 electric sirens. At the end of the recording, the metronome was switched on with a rapid rhythm of 160-180 beats per minute. When the danger was over, the electric player was switched on again by order of the staff, and the alarm was sounded in the streets and houses, accompanied by the sound of fanfares.

Slovenia
Slovenia has 1,563 operable civil defence sirens. Most of them are electronic sirens, although there are some mechanical ones. Civil defence sirens are mounted on fire stations, town halls, or other structures.

Three siren tones are used in the country:

 Warning (Opozorilo na nevarnost): 2-minute long steady tone. Serves as a warning of the impending danger of a fire, natural or other type of disaster, or high water level.
 Immediate danger (Neposredna nevarnost): 1-minute wailing tone. Used in case of dangers, such as major fires, floods, radiological or chemical danger and air raid.
 All clear - end of danger (Konec nevarnosti): 30-second steady tone. It is heard during tests of air raid sirens each month on the first Saturday of each month at noon, and at the end of an emergency for which the immediate danger signal was sounded.

Since 1 September 1998, there are two additional siren tones, which are used in certain Slovenian municipalities. The municipalities of Hrastnik and Trbovlje use a special signal (called Neposredna nevarnost nesreče s klorom) for the immediate danger in case of an accident involving chlorine when there is a danger of chlorine leaks in the environment. The 100 second long signal consists of a 30-second wailing tone immediately followed by a 40-second steady tone and again of a 30-second wailing tone. The municipalities of Muta, Vuzenica, Podvelka, Radlje ob Dravi, Brežice, Krško and Sevnica use a 100-second long wailing signal (named Neposredna nevarnost poplavnega vala) (consisting of 4-second bursts separated by 4 seconds of silence) for the immediate danger of flash floods, used in case of overflow or collapse of a hydroelectric dam.

When emergencies impact multiple regions at the same time, or the whole country, people are advised to listen to the first channel of the public Radio Slovenia, Val 202, or watch the first or second channel of the public broadcaster RTV Slovenija. Emergencies of smaller extent are announced via regional radio and TV stations.

Until 1 January 1998, air raid sirens were tested each Saturday at noon. The formerly used warning signals were:

 General public mobilisation (Splošna javna mobilizacija): 3-minute long ascending and descending tone, consisting of alternating 10-second bursts and 5 seconds of silence
 Immediate danger of air raid (Zračna nevarnost): 1-minute wailing tone
 ABC (chemical, biological, nuclear disaster) alarm (Radiacijsko-biološko-kemična nevarnost): 90-second tone, consisting of three 20-second ascending and descending bursts, separated by 15 seconds of silence
 Fire alarm (Požarna nevarnost): 90-second tone, consisting of three 20-second steady bursts, separated by 15 seconds of silence
 (Natural) disaster (Nevarnost naravnih nesreč): 60-second signal with alternating 20 seconds of steady tone, 20 seconds of ascending and descending tone and another 20-second wailing tone
 All clear (Konec nevarnosti): 60-second steady tone

Spain
Few sirens that were used for civil defence against bombings during the Spanish Civil War are preserved. The Guernica siren has a highly symbolic value because of the impact of the Bombing of Guernica. Barcelona City History Museum preserves one related to the Bombing of Barcelona, and another siren from civil war years is also preserved in Valencia.

Sweden
The Swedish alarm system uses outdoor sirens in addition to information transmitted through radio and television and sent by text messages and mobile apps. Special radio receivers are handed out to residents living near nuclear power plants. These sirens were first tested in 1931, and were mounted to cars and bikes sent out by the government. The sirens can be found on tall buildings all around Sweden. They are driven by compressed air in giant tanks, but are successively being replaced by modern electronic sirens which use speakers. The emergency services are also able to send out spoken messages through the new sirens. The outdoor signals used are as follows:

 Readiness alarm: a 5-minute pattern of 30 second tones separated by 15 second gaps. Used when an imminent danger of war is present.
 Air raid alarm: a 1-minute pattern of 2 second tones separated by 2 second gaps. Sent when the threat of an air attack is imminent.
 Important public announcement, general alarm: a pattern of 7 second long tones and 14 second long gaps. People should go inside, close windows and doors, close ventilation, and listen to radio channel P4.
 All clear: a 30-second long single tone. Used for all above signals when danger is over.

The outdoor sirens are tested four times a year on the first non-holiday Monday of March, June, September, and December at 15:00 local time. The test consists of the general alarm for 2 minutes, followed by a 90-second gap before the "all clear" is sounded.

There are usually around 15 to 20 general alarms, occurring locally, per year. The most common cause of general alarms is fire, specially in situations that involve industries, landfills, and other facilities containing dangerous substances which can create hazardous smoke. The 2018 peak in alarms (54 that year) is attributed to the 2018 Sweden wildfires which alone caused over 20 general alarms. Other possible attributing factors could be the increased public safety awareness after the 2017 Stockholm truck attack.

Switzerland

Switzerland currently has 8,500 mobile and stationary civil defense sirens, which can alert 99% of the population. There are also 700 sirens located near dams. Every year on the first Wednesday of February, Switzerland's sirens are tested to see if they are functioning properly. During this test, general alert sirens as well as sirens near dams are checked. The population is informed of the test in the days leading up to the tests by radio, television, teletext, and newspapers, and the siren tests do not require the population to take any special measures.

The tones of the different sirens are provided on the last page of all phone books as well as on the Internet.

 General alert: a 1-minute regularly ascending and descending tone, followed by a 2-minute interval of silence before repeating. The 'general alert' siren goes off when there is a possible threat to the population. The population is instructed to inform those around them to proceed inside. Once inside, people are instructed to listen to emergency broadcasts made by the broadcasting networks SRF, RTS, RSI and RSR.
 Flood alert: 12 continuous low-pitched tones, each lasting 20 seconds. The flood alert is activated once the general siren is sounding. If heard by the population in danger zones (such as near dams), they must leave the dangerous area immediately or find shelter.

Ukraine

Ukraine has employed civil defense sirens to warn citizens of danger during the 2022 Russian invasion of Ukraine.

The observed use of sirens in Ukraine has been the following:
Danger threat: Repeated long bursts
All Clear: Final Short burst

United Kingdom

During World WarII, Britain had two warning tones:

 Red warning: attack in progress or imminent (attack/wail)
 All clear: attack over (steady alert)

These tones would be initiated by the Royal Observer Corps after spotting Luftwaffe aircraft coming toward Britain, with the help of coastal radar stations. The "red warning" would be sounded when the Royal Observer Corps spotted enemy aircraft in the immediate area. The sirens were tested periodically by emitting the tones in reverse order, with the "all clear" tone followed by the "red warning" tone. This ensured the public would not confuse a test with a real warning.

Every village, town, and city in the United Kingdom used to have a network of dual-tone sirens to warn of incoming air raids during World WarII. The operation of the sirens was coordinated by a wire broadcast system via police stations. In towns and cities with a population of over 3,000, powered sirens were used, whereas in rural areas hand-operated sirens were used (which were later put to use as warnings for nuclear attack during the Cold War). At the end of the Cold War in 1992, the siren network was decommissioned, and very few remain. These sirens, mostly built by Carter, Gents, Castle Castings, and Secomak (now Klaxon Signal Co.), have 10 and 12 ports to create a minor third interval (B and D notes) and are probably the world's most recognised World WarII air raid siren sound. Recordings of British sirens are often dubbed into movies set in countries which never used this type of siren.

Around 1,200 sirens remain, mostly used to warn the public of severe flooding. They are also used for public warning near gas or nuclear power plants, nuclear submarine bases, oil refineries and chemical plants. The remaining sirens are a mix of older motor driven models (usually from World WarII), such as the Carter siren manufactured by Carter's of Nelson or the "syren" manufactured by Gent's of Leicester, and Cold War like Castle Castings and Secomak (now Klaxon Signal Co.) and newer electronic sirens like Hormann ECN, Whelen, Federal Signal Modulator, ATI HPSS and COOPER WAVES. Most of them usually tested annually between August and September if they're not in a siren system. They are also used to start and finish silences on Armistice Day and Remembrance Sunday
 
There was a siren system consisted mainly of Castle Castings and 2 Secomak GP3s for their flood warning system sector. When MoD was decommissioning these systems across the country, Norfolk kept their sector back for flood warning. With the advent of digital services and mobile technology, many local authorities are now retiring their siren networks in favour of contacting people by telephone. In January 2007, proposals to retire a network of sirens in Norfolk were made by the Norfolk Resilience Forum. In November 2007, residents were angered after the sirens had not sounded following a tidal surge in Walcott. In 2008, a review of the current and future role of flood warning sirens was undertaken by Norfolk County Council, after plans to retire them were halted following concerns from nearby residents. Although some of the sirens were initially withdrawn, 40 out of the 57 were eventually temporarily reinstated. Despite this, in July 2010 the flood warning sirens were finally retired in favour of alerting people by telephone, SMS or e-mail. After three years of consultations, the council had failed to demonstrate that refurbishing the sirens would be a worthwhile investment. The whole siren system was completely gone by late 2013, with only 2 sirens remaining, which are both inactive with one of them refurbished and put on display on a beach not far from its original location, and another, in Mundesley Fire Station, just standing there, extremely unlikely to ever sound again.

Lincolnshire, which had one of the largest siren systems in the country consisting of Carters, had 46 sirens based in North Somercotes, Mablethorpe, Boston, Skegness, Spalding and Sutton Bridge, as well as inland at Louth, Horncastle, Middle Rasen and Gainsborough, the areas most at risk of being hit by floods. Following serious flooding in the summer of 2007, investigations took place into how the flood warning system could be improved. The Environment Agency admitted that the warning system in Louth had not sounded early enough. In April 2008, Lincolnshire County Council began to investigate the possibility of replacing the flood warning sirens with mobile phone alerts. A council report in November 2009 described the sirens as being "outdated, in the wrong places and difficult to repair". The sirens were eventually decommissioned in November 2011 and replaced with Floodline.

In January 2010, 13 public warning sirens on the island of Guernsey that had first been installed in 1937 were due to be retired and replaced by text messages. This followed claims by the Home Department that the sirens had "reached the end of their useful working life". The sirens had previously been used to warn of major incidents. From 1950 to 2010, the Civil Defence Committee took responsibility for the sirens, and had tested them annually since 9 May 1979. Members of the public had criticised the decision, and Deputy Janine Le Sauvage claimed that sirens were the only way everyone knew there was an emergency. In February 2010, 40 islanders formed a protest march opposing the proposal to retire the sirens. The campaigners accused the government of not listening to them, as an online petition calling for the sirens to be saved was signed by more than 2,000 people. In April 2010, it was decided to dismantle the public warning system. Emergency planners had proposed to use a new warning system that would contact residents by telephone; however, this was abandoned due to technical limitations and local media and other communication methods are used instead. Only 2 remain in Guernsey, one in Victoria Tower, which sounded off once at around 2017, and another, active for a quarry.

Following severe flooding in Upper Calder Valley in June 2000, the Environment Agency replaced its network of sirens, with eight being placed around Walsden, Todmorden, Hebden Bridge and Mytholmroyd. The network was designed to complement the agency's Floodline service. These sirens became what is now known as the Todmorden Flood Warning System. There are 9 sirens that are part of the system, 5 of them being Secomak, 3 of them being Klaxon and one of them being Carter (which was recently confirmed to be inactive according to the local environment agency).

In November 2010, 36 flood warning sirens in Essex, including nine on Canvey, were retired following concerns from the county council that the system was "no longer fit for purpose". The sirens were due to become obsolete in 2014. Only 5 sirens from the entire system remain, 2 of them in Canvey Island.

In September 2012, new flood warning sirens were installed in the Dunhills Estate in Leeds, as part of flood defence work at Wyke Beck. In January 2014, flood sirens sounded for the first time in 30 years on the Isle of Portland.

Broadmoor Hospital used 13 sirens installed in 1952, which were tested weekly. These were consisted of Secomak CS8s, which weres similar to a Secomak GP8 except the CS8 had coded shutters which could do an alternating hi-lo signal, and if designed to do so, could also do a pulse signal. For emergencies, they sounded the hi-lo and for all clear, they sounded a steady tone. In tests, they would sound the all-clear. In July 2014, plans were put forward to retire 7 of the 13 alarms, which had last been properly activated in 1993. The alarms are located in areas such as Sandhurst, Wokingham, Bracknell, Camberley and Bagshot. In June 2016, the West London Mental Health Trust, who manages the hospital, proposed decommissioning the sirens altogether and replacing them with social media alerts through websites such as Twitter. In December 2019, this entire system was decommissioned, in favour of only one CS8 operating at the site itself for "silent testing" every Monday. The Monday "silent testing" has ceased and the last remaining siren is silenced and quite likely inactive.

A similar siren system in Carstairs, Scotland, called the Carstairs Hospital Siren System, uses 9 sirens, 7 of them being Secomak CS8, 1 being a Klaxon GP8 and 1 being Secomak GP12. The hi-lo signal is rarely used since during emergencies, they sound a continuous tone for 8 minutes and in all clear, they sound a long wail, consisting of 30 seconds startup and alert and a 30-second wind-down 3 times. Test schedule is the third Thursday of every month at 1PM with the all-clear.

There are several sirens in use around Avonmouth near Bristol to warn of chemical incidents from industry in the area. These are known as the Severnside Sirens. These sirens consist of Federal Signal Modulators and two DSAs, which were installed in 1997 for the public. The system is tested every third day of every month at 3PM. This consists of rising tones and a steady pulsing tone, followed by a steady tone for all clear. In emergencies, they will run for as long as the batteries can allow since they are off-grid powered.

North America

Canada
In Canada, a nationwide network of Canadian Line Materials sirens was established in the 1950s to warn urban populations of a possible Soviet nuclear attack. This system was tested nationwide twice in 1961, under the codenames Exercise Tocsin and "Tocsin B". The system was maintained until the 1970s, when advancements in military technology reduced the Soviet nuclear missile strike time from 3–5 hours to less than 15 minutes. Sirens can still be found in many Canadian cities, all in various states of repair. In Toronto, for instance, the network has been abandoned to the point where no level of government will take responsibility for its ownership. A handful of sirens still remain in Toronto in older established neighbourhoods:

 Dundas Street West and Shaw Street 
 York Quay, Harbourfront

Sirens have recently been built within 3 kilometers (2 miles) of the Darlington and Pickering nuclear power plants in the province of Ontario. (Both plants are within 30 kilometers; 20 miles of each other.) These sirens will sound in the event of a nuclear emergency that could result in a release of radioactivity. Sirens have also been placed (and are tested weekly) in Sarnia, Ontario due to the large number of chemical plants in the vicinity. These consist mainly of ATI HPSS32 sirens, as well as a Federal Signal Modulator in the rail yards and 3 Thunderbolt 1003s located at the Suncor plant.
Sirens have also been installed in and around the Grey Bruce Nuclear Generating Station. The sirens are on the plant and in the surrounding communities such as Tiverton, Ontario. One notable siren is a Federal Signal Modulator at the Bruce Nuclear Visitor's Centre. The Public Siren network as it is called, consists of mostly Whelens, Modulators, and Model 2s. One of the sirens in this network (a Model 2) is at Tiverton, which is about 10 km (6 miles) from the plant.

Many warning sirens in Ontario, Manitoba, Saskatchewan and Alberta are now used as tornado warning instruments. Smithers, British Columbia uses an old air raid siren as a noon-day whistle. New Waterford, Nova Scotia uses a siren to signal the daily curfew. One of the warning sirens was even used as a goal horn for the Quebec Nordiques between the mid-1980s and 1991. Caledonia, Ontario routinely uses an air raid siren to call in their local volunteer firefighters to the fire hall. NOAA Weather Radios in Canada are often used for advance warnings about future severe storms whenever people are at home, at a business or in a car.

United States

In the United States, several sets of warning tones have been used that have varied due to age, government structure, and manufacturer. The initial alerts used during World WarII were the alert signal (a 3–5-minute steady, continuous siren tone) and the attack signal (a 3–5-minute warbling tone, or series of short tone bursts on devices incapable of warbling, such as whistles). The Victory Siren manual stated that when a manual generation of the warbling tone was required, it could be achieved by holding the "Signal" switch on for 8 seconds and off for 4 seconds. In 1950, the Federal Civil Defense Administration revised the signals, naming the alert signal "red alert" and adding an "all clear" signal, characterized by three 1-minute steady blasts with 2 minutes of silence between the blasts.

Beginning in 1952, the Bell and Lights Air Raid Warning System, developed by AT&T, was made available to provide automated transmission of an expanded set of alert signals:

 Red alert: Attack (Imminent)
 Yellow alert: Attack (Likely)
 White alert: All Clear
 Blue alert: Hi-Lo (High-Low) (Different warning, such as local warning)

The "yellow alert" and "red alert" signals correspond to the earlier "alert" signal and "attack" signal, respectively, and the early Federal Signal AR timer siren control units featured the "take cover" button labeled with a red background and the "alert" button labeled with a yellow background. Later AF timers changed the color-coding, coloring the "alert" button blue, the "take cover" button yellow, and the "fire" button red (used to call out volunteer firefighters), thus confusing the color-coding of the alerts. In 1955, the Federal Civil Defense Administration again revised the warning signals, altering them to deal with concern over nuclear fallout. The new set of signals were the "alert" signal (unchanged) and the "take cover" signal (previously the "attack" signal). The "all clear" signal was removed because leaving a shelter while fallout was present would prove hazardous.

Sirens began to replace bells for municipal warning in the early 1900s, but became commonplace following America's entry into World WarII. Most siren models of this time were single-tone models which often sounded almost an octave higher in pitch than their European counterparts. Dual-tone sirens became more common in the 1950s, but had been used in some areas since about 1915. During the Cold War, standard signals were used throughout the country for civil defense purposes, referred to as "alert" and "attack." Volunteer fire departments generally used a different siren signal. Many towns, especially in California and New England, used coded air horns or diaphones for fire calls and reserved sirens for civil defense use.

Today, signals are determined by state and local authorities, and can vary from one region to another. The most common tones produced by sirens in the United States are "alert" (steady) and "attack" (wail). Other tones include Westminster Chimes (commonly used for the testing of electronic sirens), hi-lo (high-low), whoop, pulse (pulsing), air horn, and fast wail.

The U.S. federal standard regarding emergency warning signals is defined in FEMA's Outdoor Warning Systems Guide, CPG 1–17, published on March 1, 1980, which describes the Civil Defense Warning System (CDWS) and its warning signals. The language was slightly revised by FEMA's National Warning System Operations Manual, Manual 1550.2 published 03-30-2001:

 Attack warning: a 3 to 5-minute wavering tone on sirens or a series of short blasts on horns or other devices. The "attack warning" signal means an actual attack or accidental missile launch was detected, and people should take protective action immediately. The signal will be repeated as often as deemed necessary by local government authorities to get the required response from the population, including taking protective action from the arrival of fallout. This signal will have no other meaning and will be used for no other purpose. (However, sometimes the "attack" signals are used for tornado warnings.)
 Attention or alert warning: a 3 to 5-minute steady signal from sirens, horns, or other devices. Local government officials may authorize use of this signal to alert the public of peacetime emergencies, normally tornadoes, flash floods, and tsunamis. With the exception of any other meaning or requirement for action as determined by local governments, the "attention" or "alert" signal will indicate that all persons in the United States should "turn on [their] radio or television and listen for essential emergency information".
 A third distinctive signal may be used for other purposes, such as a local fire signal.
 All clear: no all clear signal is defined by either document.

The most common tone, "alert", is widely used by municipalities to warn citizens of impending severe weather, particularly tornadoes which have earmarked the sirens as "Tornado Sirens". This practice is nearly universal in the Midwest and parts of the Deep South, where intense and fast-moving thunderstorms that can produce tornadoes occur frequently. The "alert" sound is a steady, continuous note. In seaside towns, "alert" may also be used to warn of a tsunami. Sirens that rotate will have a rising-and-falling tone as the direction of the horn changes. The "attack" tone is the rising and falling sound of an air raid or nuclear attack, frequently heard in war movies. It was once reserved for imminent enemy attack, but is today sometimes used to warn of severe weather, tsunamis, or even fire calls, depending on local ordinance.

There is no standard "fire" signal in the United States, and while the use of sirens by volunteer fire departments is still common, it is diminishing. In the dry areas of the American West, residents may be required to shut off outdoor water systems to ensure adequate pressure at fire hydrants upon hearing the signal. The "fire" signal can vary from one community to another. Three long blasts on a siren is one common signal, similar to the signal used by volunteer brigades in Germany and other countries, while other locales use the hi-lo (high-low) signal described above. Some communities, particularly in New England and northern California, make use of coded blasts over a diaphone or air horn for fire signals, reserving the use of sirens for more serious situations. Still others use the "attack" tone as their fire call. Some communities make use of an "all clear" signal, or sound separate signals for fire calls and ambulance runs. Some fire signals in the U.S. are often blasted at least once a day, mostly at noon, to test the system, and are often referred to as "noon sirens" or "noon whistles". These also function as a time tick for setting clocks.

CPG 1-17 recommends that a monthly test be conducted, consisting of the steady "attention" signal for no more than one minute, one minute of silence, and the "attack" signal for no more than one minute. A "growl test" signal is also described by CPG 1–17, when a siren must be tested more than once a month. This is typically a 1-second burst of sound to verify the proper operation of the siren without causing a significant number of people to interpret the test as an actual alert. Many cities in the U.S. periodically sound their sirens as a test, either weekly, monthly, or yearly, at a day and hour set by each individual city.

In the United States, there is no national level alert system. Normally, sirens are controlled on a county or local level, but some are controlled on a state level, such as in Hawaii. Sirens are usually used to warn of impending natural disaster; while they are also used to warn of threats of military attacks, these rarely occur in the United States. Throughout the Great Plains, Midwest, and South, they are typically used to warn the public to take cover when a tornado warning is issued, sometimes even for severe thunderstorm warnings, and very rarely used for anything else. They are generally required in areas within a ten-mile radius of nuclear power plants. In the South and on the East Coast (except for Texas, Maine, Florida and New Hampshire), sirens are used to inform people about approaching hurricanes.

In Pierce County, Washington there is a system of sirens set up along the Puyallup and Carbon River valleys to warn residents of volcanic eruptions and lahars (giant mudslides) from Mt. Rainier.

Coastal communities, especially those in northern California, Oregon, Washington, Alaska, and Hawaii, use siren systems to warn of incoming tsunamis. In 2011, the city of Honolulu created an "Adopt-A-Siren" website for its tsunami sirens. The site is modeled after Code for America's "Adopt-a-Hydrant", which helps volunteers in Boston sign up to shovel out fire hydrants after storms.

Some U.S. volunteer fire departments, particularly in rural areas, use sirens to call volunteers to assemble at the firehouse. This method is being used less frequently as technology advances and local residents within earshot often file complaints with their town boards. Some areas utilize their sirens as a last resort, relying more on cellular and paging technology; however, a decreasing number of rural departments are still outside the range of wireless communications and rely on sirens to activate the local volunteer departments.

Many college campuses in the U.S., especially in the wake of the Virginia Tech shooting, have begun installing sirens to warn students in the event of dangerous incidents. Sirens in the United States have been replaced by NOAA Weather Radios for advance warnings about future severe storms whenever people are inside cars or buildings.

South America
Argentina 

Around mainly suburban areas of big cities like Bahia Blanca, Mar De Plata, Rosario, Cordoba and Comodoro Rivadavia, in police stations, fire stations, factories, weather stations, city halls and amongst common public neighbourhoods, warning sirens can be found. Most of the common models are a special model which isn't completely identified yet as of now, which however, looks like a vertical Klaxon GP6/10, a Mechtric MS22 or a vertically installed mechanical or electro-mechanical 8, 9, 11, or 12 port single tone siren, most of which have 6 rectangular horns and is most likely identified as a Kingvox. They sound off for terrorism attacks, bushfires, dam leakages, chemical plant issues, life-threatening/extremely severe weather alerts which are certain to happen, incoming enemy attack and any other common natural disasters. Other models present in the country's warning system include Federal Signal, Elektror/Siemens, Whelen, Telegrafia, Klaxon and Hörmann. In extremely urban areas like Buenos Aires, most of the mechanical sirens which used to operate in a large amount were decommissioned and replaced with a smaller amount of electronic sirens, SMS alerts to phones and in some cases, as EAS alerts to TV. In some areas around the suburban areas of the big cities, over the years and since the 2010s, some sirens were decommissioned due to maintenance upkeep even though most of them remain active. 

Two signals are commonly used. Here are the signals:

 General warning: 13 second wind-up and alert with a 6 second wind-down, which repeats 3 times. This signal is used if a public emergency is imminent.
 All clear: A 100 second alert to be used after a public emergency has been dealt with.

The all clear is mainly used during the nationwide siren testing in Argentine Volunteer Firefighters' Day, in the 2nd of June and sometimes, in some sirens, the general warning is tested after the all-clear.

Oceania

Australia

A series of 98 electronic sirens, making up a large-scale public-address system (the "Sydney CBD Emergency Warning System") and including 13 variable-message signs, are installed in the Sydney central business district. While installed in the months preceding the 2007 APEC conference, they are designed to be a permanent fixture and are tested on a monthly basis.

Some large-scale sirens are also deployed, like the Grifco Model 888, Grifco Model 777, or Klaxon SO4, which are used at fire stations for call-outs and at Sydney's beaches for shark alarms. Alarms are also used around prisons for breakouts and at many factories and schools to announce start and finish times.

A siren is located at the Kwinana BP plant south of Perth, which is tested every Monday. It is used to evacuate the plant in case of an emergency and can be heard in Kwinana and certain parts of Rockingham. It can also be used to warn of severe weather and potentially dangerous emergencies on the Kwinana Industrial Strip.

In South Australia, a number of Country Fire Service stations have a siren on or near the station. These are only activated when the brigade are responding to bushfire or grassfire events and for testing. They are not activated for every call, only as a public alert for the presence of bushfires.

As had been in Australia, Electro-mechanical sirens and electronic sirens had been used for alerting the community areas, towns and cities in Australia as in an imminent emergency. Emergency broadcast speakers will be turned on and will be informing important information as the standard emergency warning signal the affected communities within 24 hours.

There are electronic sirens that include Whelen, Telegrafia, SiRcom, Klaxon and Grifco.

In Victoria, many Country Fire Authority stations or near the fire station have a siren installed that is used to summon volunteers to an emergency callout, as well as consequently alerting the local community of brigade activity. Due to a variety of siren models in use across the state, there are 2 signals that are used, differentiated by length:
Emergency callout: siren sounds for no longer than 90 seconds.
Community alert: siren sounds for no shorter than 5 minutes.

In Melbourne's CBD, there is a set of sirens installed to warn of attack and extreme flooding. These became necessary after the Bourke and Flinders St. attacks, where people were killed as a result of a vehicle purposefully driving into pedestrians.

In Queensland, Whelen Vortex-R4 sirens have been installed as part of the Somerset Regional Council Flood Warning System. At nearby Grantham, Queensland, a Whelen WPS-2906, which features both warning tones and pre-recorded messages provides early warning in the event of flooding. As well, Cairns Regional Council have installed 9 Whelen WPS-2900 series sirens to alert to a dam breach of the nearby Copperlode Falls Dam. A map of the system can be found here, as well as additional information. Other Whelen WPS-2900 series sirens can be found in a few towns around Queensland as well.

New Zealand
Lower Hutt, Napier, Whanganui, and the former Waitakere City area of Auckland each have a network of civil defense sirens. The networks in Lower Hutt and Napier are bolstered by fire sirens that also function as civil defense sirens. Lower Hutt's network is further bolstered by selected industrial sirens that double as civil defence sirens. In the western Bay of Plenty Region, several fire sirens also serve as civil defense sirens, and there are dedicated civil defense sirens at the Bay Park Raceway in Mount Maunganui, Tokoroa, and Whangamata (which has two). Additionally, Tokoroa, Putaruru, Tirau, and Whangamata have fire sirens serving double duty as civil defense sirens. In the years following the tsunamis of the Indian Ocean earthquake in 2004, Meerkat electronic sirens were installed in all populated areas of the west coast lower than 10 metres.

Warning sounds vary from area to area, including rising and falling notes and Morse code sirens. Communities with volunteer fire brigades use a continuous note on all sirens for civil defense, and a warbling siren on the fire station siren only for fire callouts. Civil defense uses a distinctive "sting" siren that is used by all radio stations nationwide, but is currently only used for civil defense sirens in Wanganui.

Africa

Morocco 
Morocco, like other countries, has civil defense sirens in many cities and small towns. Such as the cities of Casablanca, Oujda, Asilah, M'diq,Chefchaouen, Qalaat and Sraghna. Not all cities are equipped with this system. These sirens are found at fire stations and city halls.

These sirens were installed for the first time in Morocco during the period of French and Spanish colonialism, which is still working to the present time, but some of them were dismantled  like the Marrakesh siren.

These sirens are spread in urban cities with high population densities (Casablanca's sirens), or in cities and areas threatened by natural disasters such as floods (Eureka's siren), in cities, tourist areas (M'Diq's and Chefchaouen's sirens), and in areas of dangerous industries.

These sirens are rarely used due to the lack of dangers threatening the population, but recently during the quarantine periods of the pandemic, warning sirens sounded in a number of cities such as the city of Oujda to alert the population by the time of the night closure.

These sirens are often used in Morocco during the days of Ramadan, in order to inform the citizens about the arrival of the time of Fotour.

In the past, these sirens were used in small towns to call for volunteer paramedics in emergencies such as fires or cases of drowning.

The state uses alternative means of civil defense sirens in cities that do not have sirens, such as sending warning messages in news bulletins on television or radio, or sending SMS messages to citizens' phone numbers. Police patrol car horns sound as sirens to warn in case of danger.
The state does not allocate days to test whether the sirens are working or not for unknown reasons.

See also
 List of civil defense sirens
 Emergency Alert System
 Fire alarm system
 Long Range Acoustic Device
 Rotary woofer

References

External links

 Air Raid Sirens – outdoor warning siren website
 Civil Defense Museum – Overview of sirens since their inception
 Los Angeles air raid sirens – Pictures of unused nuclear-era civil defense sirens still extant in Los Angeles, California 
 The Siren Archive – Over 1,000 siren photographs coupled with a few recordings from around the world
 The world's loudest and largest sirens ever
 "Tocsin B", Canada's dry run of its Nuclear Warning System from 1961 (CBC Radio News Special, 13 Nov 1961)
 Toronto Star – The mystery of the air raid sirens
 Michigan Civil Defense Museum
 Old German World WarII Air Raid Siren YouTube
 British World WarII Air Raid Siren with all-clear YouTube
 Federal Thunderbolt 1000T air raid siren in alert signal YouTube

Civil defense
Emergency population warning systems
Sirens
Articles containing video clips